Świeradów-Zdrój is a spa town in Lubań County, Lower Silesian Voivodeship, in south-western Poland near the border with the Czech Republic. The town is located in the Kwisa valley of the Jizera Mountains, a part of the Sudetes range.

Świeradów received its town privileges in 1946. As at 2019, it has a population of 4,147.

History
First mentioned in 1524, the settlement was probably founded at the end of the 13th or the beginning of the 14th century in the Lower Silesian Duchy of Jawor, the southwesternmost duchy of fragmented Piast-ruled Poland. The oldest record concerning Flinsberg, which in fact related to the tavern "Fegebeutel" from which the local settlement of shepherds and lumbermen was named, comes from 1337, while Flinsberg was first documented in 1559. It was located on the eastern slope of the Smrk massif, at the tripoint of historic Silesia with the Bohemian and Upper Lusatian regions.

The exceptional properties of the Flinsberg mineral springs were suspected as early as the 16th century. In 1572, the Swiss doctor Leonard Thurneysser, private physician of Elector John George of Brandenburg wrote for the first time about the discovery of the extraordinary features of the local healing waters. They were described by the Protestant reformer Caspar Schwenckfeld about 1600, and Fryderyk Luca also wrote about them in 1683 in his Silesian chronicle. The area was heavily devastated during the Thirty Years' War, at first by Imperial troops under General Ottavio Piccolomini, then by Swedish forces in the course of the seize of nearby Gryf Castle (Greiffenstein) in Proszówka ( Gräflich Neundorf).

A century later the land owners of the Schaffgotsch noble family established a special commission to gather scientific evidence and describe the healing effects of the Świeradów waters. The commission settled that the water “…agitates appetite, inhibits vomiting, eases anxiety states, stomach and liver illnesses”. The health resort started to develop in 1768 when the owners of land built the first spa house. The peak of health resort development occurred in the 1920s. Direct railway connection to Mirsk (then Friedeberg) operating since 1909 opened Świeradów to the world and contributed to full prosperity of the spa town.

Annexed by Kingdom of Prussia in the 18th century, from 1816 to 1945 the settlement belonged to the Löwenberg in Schlesien district (German: Landkreis Löwenberg in Schlessien).

In 1945 Bad Flinsberg was occupied by the Red Army and its German population expelled. As part of the Republic of Poland, the health resort resumed its activity on 26 May 1946. Świeradów was also granted town rights in 1946. The town was repopulated by Poles, most of whom were expelled from former eastern Poland annexed by the Soviet Union.

Name 
Świeradów-Zdrój has an exceptionally rich acquisition of names. This eventful history begins with the German name Fegebeutel, which meant ‘a place where your purse will be cleaned’ (Czyścisakwa in Polish). The name was given to the tavern situated here and the nearby settlement. Then, the name was changed to Flinsberg. The origin of that word may be sought in the pantheon of pagan gods of Lusatians. One of them was Flins.

In 1945, Bad Flinsberg became Wieniec-Zdrój. It was the first name of that town in the Polish language after the war, coming from the Polish word ‘wieniec’ (wreath), related to hills surrounding the valley from all directions. The wreath consists of Vulture Mountain (829 m a.s.l.) in the east, Zajęcznik (595 m a.s.l.) in the north, Stóg Izerski (1107 m a.s.l.) in the south-west and Opaleniec (821 m a.s.l.) in the west. Finally, however, it was decided that the town will be called Świeradów-Zdrój – since 1946. The etymology of the name is ambiguous and two explanations can be found. One explanation says that the name derived from a combination of two words: świerk (spruce) and radon without which the spa would not exist, and the other one mentions Saint Andrew Świerad, who came here from Slovakia about the year 1000.

Balneotherapy and recreation 
The spa house built in 1899 offers mineral water, radon and mud bath treatments of rheumatism and other adult diseases.

In 2008, a gondola was opened as the fourth such ski lift in Poland improving the position of Świeradów as a winter ski resort.

Twin towns – sister cities

Świeradów-Zdrój is twinned with:

 Bílý Potok, Czech Republic
 Jilemnice, Czech Republic
 Jindřichovice pod Smrkem, Czech Republic
 Lázně Libverda, Czech Republic

 Nové Město pod Smrkem, Czech Republic
 Odder, Denmark
 Seifhennersdorf, Germany

See also
Groß Iser

References

External links

Official site
Świeradów-Zdrój – Photo Gallery

Cities and towns in Lower Silesian Voivodeship
Lubań County
Spa towns in Poland